The German Lesson is a novel by the German writer Siegfried Lenz, published in 1968 in Germany. The English translation by Ernst Kaiser and Eithne Wilkins, titled The German Lesson, was first published in London by Macdonald & Co. in 1971 and later by New Directions in 1986.  was translated into several languages and is considered to be one of the defining works of German post-war literature.

Plot
Siggi Jepsen (the first-person narrator), an inmate of a juvenile detention center, is forced to write an essay with the title "The Joy of Duty." In the essay, Siggi describes his youth in Nazi Germany where his father, the "most northerly police officer in Germany," does his duty, even when he is ordered to debar his old childhood friend, the expressionist painter Max Nansen, from his profession, because the Nazis banned expressionism as "degenerate art" (entartete Kunst).

Siggi, however, is fascinated by Nansen's paintings, "the green faces, the Mongol eyes, these deformed bodies ... " and, without the knowledge of his father, manages to hide some of the confiscated paintings. Following the end of World War II, Jepsen senior is interned for a short time and later reinstalled as a policeman in rural Schleswig-Holstein. When he then obsessively continues to carry out his former orders, Siggi brings Nansen paintings that he believes to be in danger to safety. His father discovers his doings and dutifully turns him in for art theft.

When forced to write the essay on "The Joy of Duty" during his term in the juvenile detention center near Hamburg, the memories of his childhood come to the surface and he goes far beyond the "duty" of writing his essay by filling several notebooks with caustic recollections of this entire saga.

Characters
 Siggi Jepsen
 Jens Ole Jepsen, Siggi's father, a police officer
 Max Nansen, a painter, pursued by the Nazis, whom Lenz based on the expressionist painter Emil Nolde
 Gudrun Jepsen, Siggi's mother
 Klaas, Siggi's brother
 Hilke, Siggi's sister

Adaptations
In 1971 Peter Beauvais filmed  for the German TV-broadcaster ARD section SFB.

In 2019 Christian Schwochow directed  as a cinema adaption. The film stars Tobias Moretti as Max Nansen and Ulrich Noethen as Jens Jepsen, with Johanna Wokalek, Louis Hofmann and Sonja Richter in further roles.

Releases details
 German: Deutschstunde (1968). Hamburg: Hoffmann und Campe,  (First edition)
 German: Deutschstunde (2006). Hamburg: Hoffmann und Campe,  (20th ed., hardcover)
 German: Deutschstunde (2006). Munich: Deutscher Taschenbuch Verlag,  (37th ed., paperback)
 Chinese: De yu ke. (2008) Taibei Shi: Yuan liu chu ban shi ye gu fen you xian gong si, 
 French: La leçon d'allemand (2001). Paris: R. Laffont, 
 Korean: Togirŏ sigan (2000). Sŏul Tʻŭkpyŏlsi : Minŭmsa, 
 Danish: Tysktime (1996). København: Gyldendal, 
 Portuguese: A lição de alemão (1991) Lisboa: Publ. Dom Quixote, 
 Spanish: Lección de alemán (1990) Madrid: Debate, 
 Estonian: Saksa keele tund (1975). Translated by Rita Tasa. Tallinn: Eesti Raamat.
 Finnish: Saksantunti (1974). Helsinki: Uusi kirjakerho, 
 Romanian: Ora de germană (1972). București: Editura Univers. 
 Russian: Урок немецкого (1970). Москва: Прогресс, 
 Slovak: Hodina nemčiny (1972). Bratislava: Slovenský Spisovatel', 
 Czech: Hodina němčiny (1974). Praha: Odeon, 
 Hebrew: השיעור בגרמנית (1978)
 Vietnamese: Giờ Đức văn (2019). Translated by Hoàng Đăng Lãnh: Nhã Nam Books.
 Catalan: Lliçó d'alemany (2016). Translated by Joan Ferrarons. Barcelona: Club Editor,

References

1968 novels
German novels adapted into films
Novels set in Hamburg